Raia Prokhovnik (born 7 May 1951), is Reader in Politics at the Open University's Faculty of Social Sciences, for their Department of Politics and International Studies, and founding editor of the journal Contemporary Political Theory. She is the chair of the OU's interdisciplinary politics module, Living political ideas, and contributed to other modules including Power, dissent, equality: understanding contemporary politics.

Education
Her first degree was in political science and history from the University of New South Wales, Australia (1974), and her MSc and PhD, Rhetoric and Philosophy in Hobbes's Leviathan, are from the London School of Economics (1976 and 1980).

Teaching
Prokhovnik spent six years teaching and research at Royal Holloway, University of London, and at the University of Southampton. She joined the Open University in 2000.

Bibliography

Books

Book chapters
 
 
 
  View online.

Journal articles
 
 
 
 
 
 
  
 
  Pdf.
 
  Pdf. Article presented on YouTube.
  
 
  Pdf.

See also
 Feminist political theory
 Sovereignty
 Political philosophy
 Baruch Spinoza
 Republicanism
 Regional power
 Public policy

References

External links
 Dr. Raia Prokhovnik Open University.

1951 births
Living people
Alumni of the London School of Economics
University of New South Wales alumni
Academics of the Open University
Spinoza scholars